Janice P. Nimura is an American author.

Her book The Doctors Blackwell was a 2022 Pulitzer Prize biography finalist.

Books
Daughters of the Samurai: A Journey from East to West and Back (W. W. Norton & Company, 2015)
The Doctors Blackwell: How Two Pioneering Sisters Brought Medicine to Women and Women to Medicine (W. W. Norton & Company, 2021)

References

External links
 Official website

American women non-fiction writers
Year of birth missing (living people)
Living people
21st-century American non-fiction writers
21st-century American women writers